José Luis Ruiz Bernal (born 9 May 1952) is a Spanish long-distance runner. He competed in the men's 10,000 metres at the 1976 Summer Olympics.

References

1952 births
Living people
Athletes (track and field) at the 1976 Summer Olympics
Spanish male long-distance runners
Olympic athletes of Spain
Place of birth missing (living people)